Valentin Vadimovich Andyamov (born 14 February 2000) is a Russian football player. He plays for FC Znamya Noginsk.

Club career
He made his debut in the Russian Football National League for FC SKA-Khabarovsk on 11 September 2021 in a game against FC Alania Vladikavkaz.

References

External links
 
 
 Profile by Russian Football National League

2000 births
Living people
Russian footballers
Association football midfielders
FC Anzhi Makhachkala players
FC Ararat Moscow players
FC Chernomorets Novorossiysk players
FC SKA-Khabarovsk players
Russian Second League players
Russian First League players